Jan Lennart "Lill-Strimma" Svedberg (29 February 1944 – 29 July 1972) was a Swedish ice hockey defenceman.  He played for Timrå IK and Brynäs IF. He also played on the Swedish national team during six IIHF World Championships and the 1968 Winter Olympics. Svedberg was named best defenceman at the 1970 World Championships.

Svedberg died in a road accident outside of Timrå, Sweden, in July 1972, colliding with Leif Engvalls' tour-bus.

See also
List of ice hockey players who died during their playing careers

Sources
IIHF Directorate Awards

External links

1944 births
1972 deaths
Brynäs IF players
Ice hockey players with retired numbers
Ice hockey players at the 1968 Winter Olympics
Olympic ice hockey players of Sweden
People from Timrå Municipality
Road incident deaths in Sweden
Swedish ice hockey defencemen
Timrå IK players
Sportspeople from Västernorrland County